The Ferruginous Sands is a geologic formation in England. It preserves fossils dating back to the Aptian Stage of the Cretaceous period. It consists of "a number of heavily bioturbated coarsening-upward units each comprising dark grey sandy muds or muddy sands passing up into fine-to medium-grained grey to green glauconitic sands." The dinosaur Vectaerovenator inopinatus is known from the formation. Shark teeth are also known from the formation, including those of an indeterminate lamniform shark and Palaeospinax (formerly Synechodus).

See also

 List of fossiliferous stratigraphic units in England

References

 

Cretaceous England
Aptian Stage
Lower Cretaceous Series of Europe